The World Group II Play-offs were four ties which involved the losing nations of the World Group II and four nations from the three Zonal Group I competitions. Nations that won their play-off ties entered the 2016 World Group, while losing nations joined their respective zonal groups.

Serbia vs. Paraguay

Slovakia vs. Sweden

Japan vs. Belarus

Argentina vs. Spain

References 

World Group II Play-offs